Boggan-Hammond House and Alexander Little Wing is a historic home located at Wadesboro, Anson County, North Carolina.

The original section was built about 1787, and is a restored one-story frame Federal style structure.  The house was built by Captain Patrick Boggan, a Revolutionary War veteran who was one of the founders of the town of Wadesboro, for his daughter, Nellie.  A two-story frame wing was added in 1839.

In the 20th century the original house was separated from the wing and placed behind it. The buildings were opened to the public as house museums in 1970. It was listed on the National Register of Historic Places in 1972. It is located in the Wadesboro Downtown Historic District, on East Wade Street (County Road 1135), and is in the care of the Anson County Historical Society.

Gallery

References

External links
Boggan-Hammond House (Anson County Historical Society)

Houses on the National Register of Historic Places in North Carolina
Federal architecture in North Carolina
Houses completed in 1787
Museums in Anson County, North Carolina
Houses in Anson County, North Carolina
National Register of Historic Places in Anson County, North Carolina
Historic house museums in North Carolina
1787 establishments in North Carolina
Historic district contributing properties in North Carolina